Leptospermum nitens is a species of slender shrub that is endemic to Western Australia. It has thin, fibrous bark, narrow egg-shaped to wedge-shaped leaves, white or pink flowers on short side branches and fruit with the sepals attached but that falls from the plant shortly after the seeds reach maturity.

Description

Taxonomy and naming
Leptospermum nitens was first formally described in 1852 by Nikolai Turczaninow in the Bulletin de la Classe Physico-Mathématique de l'Académie Impériale des Sciences de Saint-Pétersbourg from material collected by James Drummond. The specific epithet (nitens) is a Latin word meaning "bright" or "gleaming".

Distribution and habitat
This tea-tree is often found on hills and among granite or sandstone rocks in parts of the Avon Wheatbelt, Coolgardie, Esperance Plains, Mallee and Murchison biogeographic regions.

References

nitens
Flora of Western Australia
Plants described in 1852
Taxa named by Nikolai Turczaninow